Morphacris is a genus of band-winged grasshoppers in the family Acrididae. There are at least two described species in Morphacris, found in Africa, Europe, and Asia.

Species
These species belong to the genus Morphacris:
 Morphacris citrina Kirby, 1910
 Morphacris fasciata (Thunberg, 1815)

References

External links

 

Acrididae